The Gedges Rocks are a group of rocks located  north-northwest of Grim Rock and  west-southwest of Cape Tuxen, off the west coast of Graham Land, Antarctica. They were discovered by the British Graham Land Expedition, 1934–37, and named "Gedges Reef" after The Gedges, a dangerous reef off the mouth of the Helford River in Cornwall, England. In 1971 the UK Antarctic Place-Names Committee reported that the term rocks is more appropriate for this feature.

References

Rock formations of Graham Land
Graham Coast